The Amazing Journey of Aharoni & Gidi is an Israeli documentary-reality TV series that explores and studies cultures, their history, religion, ceremonies and geography, through their reflection in the local food. The series follow Gidi Gov and Yisrael Aharoni through various countries all around the world.

Plot
Aharoni and Gov every week partake in a different adventure. They explore multiple countries in each season. In each country they go explore remote areas, spectacular landscapes, meet with local people and enjoy their food.

Starring
Both Gidi and Yisrael are TV stars in Israel.

Gidi is a singer, TV host, entertainer, and actor. Gidi provides the comic relief on the show.

Yisrael is a celebrity chef starring in multiple food shows in Israel. Due to his culinary background, Yisrael provides the food expertise during the show.

Seasons

Season 1 - Silk Road
Season 1 premiered June 2011 and consisted of 7 episodes, which explored Turkey, China and Italy:

Episode 1 – Sian – The beginning – the King's dumplings
Episode 2 – Going West
Episode 3 – All the way to the edge of China
Episode 4 – Buchara. Aharoni searches for his roots
Episode 5 – Eastern Turkey
Episode 6 – Turkey and the Encounter with Biblical History
Episode 7 – Pasta as Science – Italy

Season 2 - Street food
Season 2 consists of 6 episodes:

Episode 1 – Vietnam, Rice 
Episode 2 – Myanmar, Lahpet
Episode 3 – Morocco, Couscous
Episode 4 – India, Panir
Episode 5 – Thailand, Curry
Episode 6 – Xinjiang, Nomads and settlers

Season 3 - Street food
Season 3 consists of 5 episodes:

Episode 1 – Yunnan, Yiliang roast duck
 Episode 2 –  Netherlands, Herring
 Episode 3 – South Korea, Kimchi
 Episode 4 – Ethiopia, Coffe and tef, part a
 Episode 5 – Ethiopia, Coffe and tef, part b

Season 4 - Street food
Season 4 consists of 9 episodes:

Episode 1 – Japan, Tuna
Episode 2 – Italy, Sandwich
Episode 3 – India, Coconut
Episode 4 – The Mekong River
Episode 5 – Taiwan, Bamboo
Episode 6 – Mexico, Corn
Episode 7 – Peru, Potato
Episode 8 – Brazil, Sugar Mandioca and beef, part a
Episode 9 – Brazil, Sugar Mandioca and beef, part b

Season 5 - Street food
Season 5 consists of 7 episodes:

Episode 1 – Japan, Soy
Episode 2 – Taiwan, Oysters
Episode 3 – Italy, Gelato
Episode 4 – Mexico, Chocolate
Episode 5 – Cambodia, Kampot pepper crab
Episode 6 – India, Spices
Episode 7 – Peru, Ceviche

Season 6 - Around the Mediterranean 
Season 6 consists of 10 episodes:

 Episode 1 – Around the Mediterranean: Morocco
 Episode 2 – Around the Mediterranean: Sardinia
 Episode 3 – Around the Mediterranean: Greece
 Episode 4 – Around the Mediterranean: Albaniao 
 Episode 5 – Around the Mediterranean: Liguria
 Episode 6 – Around the Mediterranean: The French Riviera
 Episode 7 – Around the Mediterranean: Valencia and Andalusia, Part a
 Episode 8 – Around the Mediterranean: Valencia and Andalusia, Part b
 Episode 9 – Around the Mediterranean: Israel Part a
 Episode 10 – Around the Mediterranean: Israel Part b

Season 7 - American Road Trip 
Season 7 consists of 7 episodes, premier on 13 December 2018:

 Episode 1 – Cape Cod to NYC
 Episode 2 – NYC to Philadelphia
 Episode 3 – Philadelphia to Chicago
 Episode 4 – Chicago to Rapid City
 Episode 5 – Rapid City to Salt Lake City
 Episode 6 – Salt Lake City to South Lake Tahoe
 Episode 7 – South Lake Tahoe to San Francisco

International syndication
Aharoni & Gidi's Wonderful Adventure can be seen in the United States on the Israeli Network.

References

External links

Channel 10 (Israeli TV channel) original programming
Israeli television series
2011 Israeli television series debuts